is a Korean junior and senior high school in Ibaraki, Osaka Prefecture, Japan. It was established in 2008.

The government of Osaka Prefecture classifies the school as a "miscellaneous school".

Curriculum
The school's curriculum covers both North and South Korea, and this applies to its Korean history and language classes. Most of the school's classes are taught in Japanese. In 2014 the school's vice principal, Om Chang Joon, stated that many parents felt that North and South Korea-aligned schools should not be copying the curriculum found in Korea, and that is why KIS developed its own curriculum.

The school has Japanese, Korean, and English language classes.

Student body
As of 2014 the school had 86 students. Most of them were ethnic Koreans, some of whom had previously lived outside Japan and later returned, while a few were ethnic Japanese.

See also

Japanese international schools in South Korea:
 Japanese School in Seoul
 Busan Japanese School

References

External links
 Korea International School
  Korea International School
  Korea International School

Education in Osaka Prefecture
High schools in Osaka Prefecture
International schools in Japan
Korean international schools in Japan
Zainichi Korean culture
2008 establishments in Japan
Educational institutions established in 2008